Something More is the second album by contemporary Christian music artist, Ginny Owens. The album was released on March 19, 2002, by Rocketown Records. It peaked at No. 21 on the Billboard Christian Albums chart and No. 22 on their Heatseekers chart.

Track listing

Personnel

Musicians 
 Ginny Owens – vocals, acoustic piano, arrangements (12)
 Jeff Roach – keyboards
 Greg Herrington – programming (1-4, 6, 7, 8, 10-14)
 Chris Mosher – programming (5)
 Will Hunt – programming (9)
 Gary Burnette – guitars
 George Cocchini – guitars
 Scott Denté – guitars
 Kendall Combes – guitars (9)
 Dan Dugmore – steel guitar
 Mark Hill – bass
 Ken Lewis – percussion
 John Mark Painter – string arrangements and conductor
 John Catchings – cello
 Kristin Wilkinson – viola
 David Angell – violin
 David Davidson – violin

Production 
 Monroe Jones – producer
 Don Donahue – executive producer
 Jim Dineen – recording
 Russ Long – recording
 Tom Laune – mixing
 Steve Lotz – mix assistant
 Hank Williams – mastering at MasterMix (Nashville, Tennessee)
 Jamie Kiner – production manager
 Jimmy Abegg – image control, photography
 Scott Cornett – creative manager
 Frank W. Ockenfels 3 – photography
 Room 120 – design, illustration 
 Fleming McWilliams – stylist
 Melanie Shelley – stylist

Track information and credits adapted from the album's liner notes.

Charts

References

2002 albums
Ginny Owens albums